Trevor Colin Slack (born 26 September 1962) is an English former professional footballer who made 274 appearances in the Football League playing as a central defender for Peterborough United, Rotherham United, Grimsby Town, Northampton Town and Chesterfield.

References

1962 births
Living people
Sportspeople from Peterborough
English footballers
Association football defenders
Peterborough United F.C. players
Rotherham United F.C. players
Grimsby Town F.C. players
Northampton Town F.C. players
Chesterfield F.C. players
Barnet F.C. players
Kettering Town F.C. players
Boston United F.C. players
Corby Town F.C. players
King's Lynn F.C. players
Holbeach United F.C. players
Sudbury Town F.C. players
English Football League players
National League (English football) players